Sakaechō Station (栄町駅) is the name of two train stations in Japan:

 Sakaechō Station (Chiba), on the Chiba Urban Monorail in Chūō-ku
 Sakaechō Station (Tokyo), a tram stop on the Tokyo Sakura Tram

See also
Sakaemachi Station (disambiguation), train stations in Japan with the same kanji but different pronunciation